Second Guessing may refer to:

Songs
 Second Guessing (song) by American country music duo Florida Georgia Line. 2020
 "Second Guessing", song from Reckoning (R.E.M. album)
 "Second Guessing", song by Arlo Parks 2019
 "Second Guessing", song by American blues guitarist Jonny Lang, released in 1998 on Wander This World
 "Second Guessing", song from The Thrills EP Nothing Changes Around Here 2007